The Bugatti Vision Gran Turismo is a single-seater concept car developed by Bugatti and was manufactured in Molsheim, Alsace, France. The car was unveiled at the 2015 Frankfurt Motor Show, a month after its teaser trailer was released, which was titled #imaginEBugatti. It was built under the Vision Gran Turismo project, and with its looks, influenced the Bugatti Chiron's design language. The color scheme of the car is based on the 1937 Le Mans-winning Bugatti Type 57G Tank racer.

Only one Vision Gran Turismo exists. The car's price is estimated to be from US$5,160,000 up to US$18,000,000.

Specifications 

Designed by Achim Anscheidt, Sasha Selipanov, Etienne Salome, and Frank Heyl, the Vision Gran Turismo is a two-door concept car combining the looks of a road car and a LMP1 prototype. The Vision Gran Turismo belongs under the project of the same name.

The Vision Gran Turismo contains an 8.0 L quad-turbocharged W16 engine, heavily modified. A seven-speed dual-clutch transmission is used, which delivers the power to all four wheels, therefore making the Vision Gran Turismo an all-wheel drive car.

The car uses the pre-production Bugatti Chiron chassis #6.

The car also uses a carbon fiber structure for the body, and independent suspension.

Many aerodynamic features, primarily carbon fiber, are present along the Vision Gran Turismo body, with a LMP1-style shark fin and active rear wing, large front splitter, side air intakes, multiple NACA ducts, and DTM-style dive planes.

Ownership 
Taking the Vision Gran Turismo to service would cost the owner US$20,000, and one set of Michelin spare tires for the Vision Gran Turismo costs the owner US$93,000.

The Vision Gran Turismo also contains a crate for the owner's manuals, keys, and parts. It also contains a center lock wheel nut remover, jumper cables, four remote keys (two keys for suspension adjustment, two keys for lights and spoiler adjustments), antenna piece, and an owner's manual.

Only two people in the world have purchased and owned the Vision Gran Turismo since its unveiling. The car was originally bought by Prince Badr bin Saud of Saudi Arabia through a secret bid, along with a Bugatti Chiron that contained the same color scheme as the Vision Gran Turismo. The car was then subsequently sold to Hezy Shaked, Chairman and CSO of Tillys.

Media 
The Vision Gran Turismo is featured in the Polyphony Digital game Gran Turismo Sport as a Group X car (category made for Vision Gran Turismo cars and cars that do not fit into any other of the game's categories) and as a Group 1 car (category made for prototype race cars).
It has appeared again in Gran Turismo 7 along with its Group 1 version.

In Grand Theft Auto Online, the fictitious Truffade Nero Custom's design cues are based on the Vision GT.

See also 
 Bugatti Chiron
 Gran Turismo Sport
 Vision Gran Turismo
 Gran Turismo 7

References

External links
 Gran Turismo website

Gran Turismo (series)
Vision Gran Turismo